The May Bumps 2008 were a set of rowing races held at Cambridge University from Wednesday 11 June 2008 to Saturday 14 June 2008. The event was run as a bumps race and was the 117th set of races in the series of May Bumps which have been held annually in mid-June in this form since 1887. In 2008, a total of 171 crews took part (94 men's crews and 77 women's crews), with over 1500 participants in total.

Head of the River crews 

  men bumped  on the first day to take the headship for the first time since 1973; the first change in men's headship since 2002.

  women bumped  on the first day to take back the headship they lost in 2007.

Highest 2nd VIIIs 

  were the highest men's 2nd VIII at the end of the week, holding 14th position.

  were the highest women's 2nd VIII at the end of the week at 15th position, having started 16th.

Links to races in other years

Bumps Charts 

Below are the bumps charts all 6 men's and all 5 women's divisions, with the men's event on the left and women's event on the right. The bumps chart represents the progress of every crew over all four days of the racing. To follow the progress of any particular crew, simply find the crew's name on the left side of the chart and follow the line to the end-of-the-week finishing position on the right of the chart.

Note that this chart may not be displayed correctly if you are using a large font size on your browser. A simple way to check is to see that the first horizontal bold line, marking the boundary between divisions, lies between positions 17 and 18. The combined Hughes Hall/ Lucy Cavendish women's crews are listed as Lucy Cavendish only.

The Getting-on Race 

The Getting-on Race (GoR) allows a number of crews which did not already have a place from last year's races to compete for the right to race this year. Up to ten crews are removed from the bottom of last year's finishing order, who must then race alongside new entrants to decide which crews gain a place (with one bumps place per 3 crews competing, subject to the maximum of 10 available places).

The 2008 May Bumps Getting-on Race took place on 6 June 2008.

Competing crews

Men 

7 men's crews raced for 3 available spaces at the bottom of the 6th division. The following were successful and rowed in the bumps.

 
 
 
 

The following were unsuccessful.

Women 

10 women's crews raced for 3 available spaces at the bottom of the 5th division, but subsequently 2 further places became available. The following were successful and rowed in the bumps.

 
 
 
 
 

The following were unsuccessful.

 
 
 
 

The following did not race.

References 

 CUCBC - the organisation that runs the bumps
 1st & 3rd Trinity Boat Club - instant results service
 Cambridge University Radio (CUR1350) - live commentary, instant results, downloadable MP3s of race commentary

May Bumps results
May Bumps
May Bumps
May Bumps